"Lucy" is a song performed by Belgian singer-songwriter Tom Dice from his debut album Teardrops. It was released on 13 August 2010. It peaked to number 21 on the Belgian music chart Ultratop in the first week of October in 2010. A music video was made for the single and was uploaded to YouTube on 12 August 2010.

Track listing

Credits and personnel
 Lead vocals – Tom Dice
 Record producer – Tom Dice, Tom Helsen
 Music – Tom Dice, Tom Helsen
 Lyrics – Tom Dice, Tom Helsen
 Label: SonicAngel

Chart performance

Weekly charts

Release history

References

External links
 Official music video – YouTube

2010 singles
Tom Dice songs
Songs written by Tom Dice
2010 songs